William Walton (16 May 1961 – 18 November 2012) was an Irish hurler who played as a left wing-forward for the Kilkenny senior team.

Born in Kilkenny, Walton first played competitive hurling during his schooling at St. Kieran's College. He arrived on the inter-county scene at the age of seventeen when he first linked up with the Kilkenny minor team, before later joining the under-21 side. He made his senior debut in the 1981–82 National Hurling League. Walton went on to play a minor role for Kilkenny for just one season, and won one a set of All-Ireland and Leinster medals as a non-playing substitute, as well as a National Hurling League medal.

At club level Walton was a one-time All-Ireland medallist with James Stephens. In addition to this he also won one Leinster medal and one championship medal.

Walton's father, Tom, enjoyed All-Ireland success with Kilkenny in 1947.

For over twenty years Walton acted as selector and manager of a host of underage and adult teams, as well as serving as juvenile coaching officer with James Stephens.

Honours

Team

James Stephens
All-Ireland Senior Club Hurling Championship (1): 1982
Leinster Senior Club Hurling Championship (1): 1981
Kilkenny Senior Hurling Championship (1): 1981

Kilkenny
All-Ireland Senior Hurling Championship (1): 1982 (sub)
Leinster Senior Hurling Championship (1): 1982 (sub)
National Hurling League (1): 1981-82

References

1961 births
2012 deaths
James Stephens hurlers
Kilkenny inter-county hurlers